Jenny Choi is an American singer and cellist, who founded the Asians in Rock tour, and is the lead singer of the two-piece Chicago band, Sanawon. For many years she performed solo at the University of Illinois at Urbana–Champaign (where she received her undergraduate degree) as well as with a back-up band. She also played synthesizer and sang lead and backing vocals in the short-lived Sweet Black And Blue, with Philip Stone on drums and Ben Weasel at guitar and microphone. She played cello on Mike Park's second album North Hangook Falling, The Lawrence Arms fifth album Oh! Calcutta! and the debut album Four One Five Two by their guitarist Chris McCaughan as part of his side project Sundowner, and contributed vocals to three songs on This Is Me Smiling's first album.

Solo discography
Postcard Stories (2003 · Double Zero Records)
Jenny Choi and the Third Shift:
Grand and Ashland (2001 · Ona Records)
Bittersweet (1998 · Ona Records)

References

External links
Official website
Speaking at the Glenbrook South High School 50th anniversary

American punk rock cellists
American rock songwriters
American women rock singers
American people of Korean descent
Living people
Singers from Chicago
American women singer-songwriters
American indie rock musicians
Year of birth missing (living people)
Place of birth missing (living people)
People from Glenview, Illinois
University of Illinois Urbana-Champaign alumni
Sundowner (band) members
Singer-songwriters from Illinois
21st-century American women
Women punk rock singers